Piotr Sarata is a former Polish slalom canoeist who competed in the 1980s. He won a bronze medal in the C-1 team event at the 1985 ICF Canoe Slalom World Championships in Augsburg.

References

Polish male canoeists
Living people
Year of birth missing (living people)
Place of birth missing (living people)
Medalists at the ICF Canoe Slalom World Championships